= Brampton Etobicoke District Cricket Association =

Recreational Cricket league

Brampton Etobicoke District Cricket League, popularly known as BEDCL is one of the most popular cricket leagues in Canada, it is the body responsible for the governance of cricket played in the regions of Brampton and Etobicoke in the province of Ontario, Canada.

== History ==
The BEDCL formerly just known as an EDCL was formed in the early 1980s, by a group of enthusiastic cricket lovers. The league kept growing with cricket getting popular in the province of Ontario. The league now collaborated EDCL - The Etobicoke & District Cricket League (which has been in existence for over 30 years) and the BCA - The Brampton Cricket Association (which has been in existence since 2004).
